Changzhi Medical College (长治医学院) is a university in Shanxi, People's Republic of China under the authority of the provincial government.

Universities and colleges in Shanxi
Medical schools in China
Changzhi
1946 establishments in China